Ana Štajdohar (born November 24, 1979) is a Serbian singer. Began her career as a member of dance-pop group Tap 011, she is recognised for performing on late-night talk show Veče sa Ivanom Ivanovićem.

Life and career 
Ana Štajdohar was born on November 24, 1979 in Belgrade to parents of Slovenian descent. While vacationing in Hvar, Croatia with her family when she was only four years old, Štajdohar performed "Julie" by Danijel Popović at his gig to standing ovation from both the crowd and Popović himself. She later started attending Mokranjac Music School and was a soloist to well known children choirs, such as "Kolibri" and "JNA", performing at their annual concerts in Sava Center.

Štajdohar rose to prominence when she joined Tap 011 with Nataša Guberinić as lead singers replacing Goca Tržan and Ivana Peters. With the group she went on to release two studio albums, Čudesna Ploča (Miraculous Record) in 2001 and 5 Element (Fifth Element) the following year. In 2008, Štajdohar alongside Aleksa Jelić appeared on Beovizija music festival with folk-oriented song "Beli jablan" (White Oak) to qualify as Serbia's entry for the Eurovision Song Contest. Although finishing as the runners-up, they were awarded for the best stage performance. Since 2010, Štajdohar has been performing on the late-night talk show Veče sa Ivanom Ivanovićem with her band. She has also served as back vocalist to artist such as Zdravko Čolić, Vlado Georgiev, Nataša Bekvalac and Saša Kovačević

In 2008, Štajdohar graduated in Italian language and literature at the University of Belgrade Faculty of Philology. She is married to her band's saxophonist, Nikola Demonja, with whom she has a son and a daughter.

Discography 
Singles
 "Beli jablan" (2008); featuring Aleksa Jelić
 "Quiero" (2008); featuring Aleksa Jelić
 "Žute sandale" (2008)
 "Nisam tu" (2010
 "Extra" (2011); featuring Cvija
 "U mraku" (2011)
 "Neko kao ti" (2013)
 "Just To Be With You" (2013)
 "Lilihip" (2015)
 "Samo ti" (2016)
 "Toplo Hladno" (2018)

References

External links 
 Ana Štajdohar at MySpace
 Ana Štajdohar Interview

1979 births
Living people
Singers from Belgrade
21st-century Serbian women singers
Serbian pop singers
Sopranos
University of Belgrade Faculty of Philology alumni
Serbian people of Slovenian descent
Beovizija contestants